Terence John Skiverton (born 26 June 1975) is an English former footballer who enjoyed a long playing career at Yeovil Town for 11 years, appearing 382 times in all competitions, before becoming their manager and subsequently, assistant manager, manager and then assistant manager again. He is currently assistant manager at  club AFC Wimbledon.

As a player, Skiverton played as a centre-back. He started his career at Chelsea, failing to make a first-team appearance but made many reserve appearances, making Captain of the reserve team before moving to Wycombe Wanderers – initially on loan – and then dropping out of the football league by moving to Welling United. He finally retired with Yeovil in 2010. As captain, Skiverton took Yeovil into the Football League for the first time in their history. While playing for Yeovil in the Conference he was called up several times for the England Semi-Pro side and made four appearances.

Playing career
Skiverton was born in Mile End, London, and began his career as a trainee at Chelsea, but never made the first team. After a loan spell he made the permanent move to Wycombe Wanderers in 1996, and a year later dropped out of league football to join Welling United. He also had a short spell in Norway in 1995, playing for Sandefjord Ballklubb in Norwegian First Division.

He joined Yeovil from Welling in 1999, and was a key part of the club, playing at centre-back as they gained promotions from the Football Conference up to Football League One.

After joining Yeovil he gained cult status with the fans and is a hero at the club, playing over 300 league games before becoming player-manager of the club. Skiverton announced his retirement from playing on 9 May 2010 after appearing 382 times and scoring 42 goals in all competitions making him Yeovil's tenth most-capped post-war player. He even played in goal to cover for the injured Steve Mildenhall in a game against Leyton Orient in September 2007. He conceded no goals after coming on to the pitch.

Skiverton made what was expected to be his final appearance ever as a player in Darren Way's Benefit match against Manchester United Reserves.

Coaching career

Yeovil Town
On 18 February 2009 Skiverton was named as Yeovil's player-manager after the club had parted company with Russell Slade earlier in the week. He succeeded in keeping Yeovil in League One with a series of good home results finishing in 15th place with 53 points.

On 9 May 2010, after only appearing as a player twice since his appointment he relinquished his playing duties and became just a manager.

In January 2011, Skiverton was nominated for the Football League's Manager of the Month award but he subsequently lost out to Rochdale manager Keith Hill, and on 26 February 2011, Skiverton took charge of his 100th match as Yeovil manager in a 1 – 0 win away to Tranmere Rovers.

On 9 January 2012, Skiverton stood down as manager, with former Yeovil boss Gary Johnson returning for his second spell in charge. Skiverton took on the role of assistant manager.

On 4 February 2015, after Johnson was relieved of his role as manager Skiverton was once again promoted back to acting first team manager. After only winning two of his thirteen matches in charge Skiverton was demoted back to assistant manager with the club appointing Paul Sturrock as the club's new first team manager.

On 15 January 2022, Skiverton left his position assistant manager at Yeovil Town.

Charlton Athletic
On 18 January 2022, Skiverton was appointed as First-Team Coach at Charlton Athletic.

On 3 May 2022, Skiverton left his role at Charlton Athletic following the departure of first-team manager Johnnie Jackson on the same day.

AFC Wimbledon
On 16 May 2022, Skiverton was appointed as assistant manager at AFC Wimbledon joining his former Charlton Athletic manager Johnnie Jackson at the club.

Managerial statistics

A.  The "Win %" column is rounded to two decimal places.

Personal life
While at Welling, and at Yeovil until the club turned professional, Skiverton appeared on Dream Team on the staff of Harchester United.

Honours
Yeovil Town
FA Trophy: 2001–02
Football Conference: 2002–03
Football League Two: 2004–05

Individual
Football Conference Team of the Year: 2002–03
PFA Team of the Year: 2006–07 League One

References

External links

Profile on Official YTFC Site
 (NB The soccerbase records are incomplete for while he was at Welling).

Terry Skiverton profile at the League Managers Association

1975 births
Living people
Footballers from Mile End
English footballers
Association football defenders
English football managers
Welling United F.C. players
Chelsea F.C. players
Wycombe Wanderers F.C. players
Yeovil Town F.C. players
Yeovil Town F.C. managers
Yeovil Town F.C. non-playing staff
Charlton Athletic F.C. non-playing staff
AFC Wimbledon non-playing staff
England semi-pro international footballers
English Football League players
National League (English football) players
English Football League managers